Sofía Petro Alcocer is a Colombian activist, feminist and progressive, daughter of the President of Colombia Gustavo Petro and his third wife, Verónica Alcocer.

Activism 
Sofia has expressed on multiple occasions her unconditional support for the most disadvantaged communities in her country from her position as a privileged person, she has called herself a feminist, and an environmental activist, the fight for feminist causes and the rights of the LGTBI community, sofia has participated in several environmental forums.

References

Living people
People from Bogotá
Colombian women activists
Colombian women environmentalists
Youth climate activists
Feminists
Year of birth missing (living people)